Gustavo Petro and Francia Márquez inaugurated as 34th President of Colombia and 19th Vice President of Colombia, respectively, on August 7, 2022, in a ceremony held in the National Capitol of Colombia in Bogotá, beginning the presidency of Gustavo Petro.

Planning
For this occasion, the presidential inauguration ceremony had a lower budget than the previous one, this was proposed by the president-elect Gustavo Petro, who assured that his presidential ceremony would be austere in benevolence to inflation due to the covid health crisis, among others.

The planning committee in charge, together with the new incoming government, agreed that they would not use pompous and so-called unnecessary elements, such as rugs and pennants for the 6 columns of the National Capitol, instead they used tropical flowers such as begonias and the popular orchids, in the case of the flags of the 32 departments of Colombia, mandatory elements as dictated by tradition and protocol, were replaced by traditional Colombian flower saddles that had a respective flag made of flowers in the center of this, in total 32 silletas each with the flags of the 32 departments and the capital district were located all the way from the San Carlos Palace that led to the plaza de Bolívar

Schedule
The inauguration ceremony began at 2:30 pm, when Petro, his wife, Verónica, and their children, as is customary, left the San Carlos Palace for the Plaza de Bolívar of the National Capitol escorted by ten pipers from the Colombian Navy. After leaving the official residence, dozens of supporters were waiting for him at the entrance, with Colombian flags while chanting slogans. Meanwhile, Francia Márquez, her husband, and their children made their entrance to the Plaza de Bolívar, the convoy arrived at the plaza minutes later.

During the parade, Petro and Véronica greeted the public. While their children followed the couple on their presidential walk. Andrea, eldest daughter of Petro and his first wife, was placed second accompanied by their daughters, in the back were Sofía, Nicolas and Antonella, and lastly, Nicolas and his wife Natalia.

Once Petro and his family arrived at the Plaza de Bolívar, president of the Senate Roy Barreras read his speech and immediately called María José Pizarro who, accompanied by the latter, prepared to impose the presidential sash and as a next act proceeded to the swearing in of Francia Márquez as vice president before thousands of spectators, the respective presidents of the Senate and the president of the Chamber of Representatives, former presidents and other guests.

After signing the investiture act, Petro delivered his first speech as the new Colombian head of state. In his first act as president, he demanded from the head of the military house of the house of Nariño, the presence of the sword of Bolívar, symbol of the emancipation of the so-called Bolivarian countries, which he had previously stolen during his instance in the revolutionary movement M-19.

Once his speech of almost half an hour was over, Petro and his family went to the House of Nariño where, as tradition dictates, the outgoing President Ivan Duque and his wife María Juliana Ruiz were waiting at the door, and immediately afterwards Petro greeted the members of the military who were waiting for him at the gates at the entrance to the house of nariño, moving through the main square to the steps of the house of nariño where he prepared to greet the outgoing presidential couple, as the next act petro in the company of his family settled at the top of the stairs, while ivan duque and his wife went down the stairs to take the traditional last walk in the company of his cabinet through the main square during these moments the band of the presidential guard I sing the salute to the traditional anthem flag to salute the Colombian head of state.

Oaths of office
The president of the Senate, Roy Barreras, the natural head of congress, administered the oath of office to Petro at 3:30 p.m. m., with 20 minutes remaining in Duque's term. Barreras became the first president to take an inaugural oath twice after taking the Santos oath in 2012. Petro recited the following:

The incumbent President then administered Márquez's oath of office at 4:40 p.m. m., with 20 minutes remaining in Ramirez's term. Márquez recited the following, as prescribed by the Constitution:

Bolivar sword

The planning of the presidential inauguration was in the hands of Eva Ferrer, to whom the president-elect Petro had expressed the intention of the presence of the sword of Bolívar in his inaugural act as well as that the act be as public as possible with the presence of people in the squares, which generated great and arduous work, since the idea of paying an insurance of 300 million pesos that was worth the insurance policy required for the presence of the mythical bolivar sword.

On Saturday afternoon, August 6, the Casa de Nariño shared a statement in which it was emphatically prohibited for Bolivar's sword to come out, as well as a prohibition on the idea of ​​installing Fernando's peace dove sculpture. Botero, the statement argued that the sword could not be lent for security reasons, as this is an element of great historical value, expressing that while he was president, the sword did not leave the house of Nariño.

On August 7, after he was sworn in as president, this would be his first petition as president of the republic, the presence of the sword of Bolivar at the inauguration ceremony was exercised by members of the military house of the house of Nariño who in They entered for 5 minutes guarding the sword that was in a 3-mm bulletproof glass case that had been tested 3 days before the opening ceremony, the outgoing president allowed the departure of the sword before a supervision carried out by himself where, once he had supervised that the pertinent protocols were taken, he gave the order to the head of the military house to guard the sword upon its arrival at the Plaza de Bolivar.

Television broadcast

Colombian broadcasters coverage
The coverage began early at 9:00 in the morning, the main television and radio networks in the country settled in a press room and exclusive boxes for the official broadcast.

Media such as Caracol Television, RCN, Red Mas and Señal Colombia carried out exclusive coverage of the presidential inauguration minute by minute, with the analysis of each symbology and an interpretation of the long-awaited opening speech by Gustavo Petro.

Presence of world leaders
22 foreign delegations travelled to Bogota for the presidential inauguration. In the House of Nariño, the President, the Vice President and the Minister of Foreign Affairs greeted the following:

  – President Alberto Fernández
  – President of the Algerian Parliament Ibrahim Boughali
  – President Luis Arce
  – Minister of Foreign Affairs Carlos Alberto França
  – President Gabriel Boric and the First lady Irina Karamanos
  – President Rodrigo Chaves
  – Minister of Foreign Affairs Bruno Rodríguez Parrilla
  – Prime Minister Gilmar Pisas
  – President Luis Abinader
  – President Guillermo Lasso
  – Vice President Félix Ulloa
  – President Xiomara Castro
  – President Laurentino Cortizo
  – Minister of Foreign Affairs Riyad al-Maliki
  – President Mario Abdo Benítez
  – Vice President Dina Boluarte
  – Minister of Foreign Affairs João Gomes Cravinho
  – HM The King of Spain
  – Minister of Foreign Affairs Nikola Selaković
  – First Lady Beatriz Gutiérrez Müller
  – Vice President Beatriz Argimón
  –  Administrator of the United States Agency for International Development Samantha Power

Presence of former presidents and first ladies
 Juan Manuel Santos, 32th President
 María Clemencia Rodríguez, former First lady
 Ernesto Samper, 29th President
 Jacquin Strouss, former First lady
 César Gaviria, 28th President
 Ana Milena Muñoz, former First lady

See also
 Gustavo Petro 2022 presidential campaign
 Presidency of Gustavo Petro
 Gustavo Petro
 Francia Márquez

References

Gustavo Petro
Presidency of Gustavo Petro
Petro, Gustavo
2022 in Colombia
2022 in politics
August 2022 events in South America